Oliver-Mercer Electric Cooperative is a public utility cooperative based in Hazen, North Dakota.  It serves as the electric distribution utility in a portion of south central North Dakota.  Oliver-Mercer Electric receives power from Basin Electric Power Cooperative and from the Western Area Power Administration.

External links
Oliver-Mercer Electric Cooperative site

Electric cooperatives in North Dakota
Electric power companies of the United States